Nirala, real name Syed Muzaffar Husain Zaidi (8 August 1937 – 9 December 1990) was a Pakistani comedian and film actor. He only appeared in Urdu films made in Pakistan. His first film was Aur bhi gham hain (1960). His last film was Choroan Ka Badshah, which was released in 1988. His most successful film was Armaan in 1966, in which he played a supporting role with Waheed Murad.

Early life and acting career 
He was born in Uttar Pradesh on 8 August 1937. Nirala was raised in India and then moved to Pakistan along with his family elders after the independence of Pakistan in 1947. They settled in Karachi in a rented house located at Abyssinia Lines (now known as Shahrah-e-Faisal Road) in Karachi.

Syed Muzaffar Husain Zaidi was known for his jokes and gimmicks since his earlier days. In the year 1959, he was invited to an entertainment program in Karachi.
At that event, he entertained the public with his comedy. The audience was all praise for Muzaffar's one particular comedy, in which he acted as a professional pigeon caretaker. That caretaker's entire life revolves around pigeons.

A year later, Syed Muzaffar Husain Zaidi took the professional name Nirala and debuted in the 1960 film Aur Bhi Gham Hain, producer, Danish Dairwee, director, A.H. Siddiqui. In his debut movie, Nirala played the role of that same pigeon-lover, who was obsessed with pigeons. Nirala's interest was to create laughter, and he was highly successful at it.

Besides working in the movies, Nirala performed comedy routines at private parties, social events and stage shows around the country. In the 1970s, he married an Indian woman and had many children. He continued his profession as a comedian until his death in 1990.

Filmography

Stage plays
 ''Bakra Qiston Per with comedian Umer Sharif

Death
In the 1980s, Nirala moved to Karachi and made stage appearances with comedian Umer Sharif. He was fond of chewing beetle leaf. Excessive use of beetle leaf took its toll on his health, which deteriorated with the passage of time. He died on 9 December 1990, in Karachi.

Awards 
 Nigar Award for Best Comedian for the film, Armaan (1966 film).

See also 
 List of Lollywood actors

References

External links
 
Filmography of Nirala on Complete Index To World Film (CITWF) website (Archived)

1990 deaths
Male actors from Uttar Pradesh
Muhajir people
Pakistani male film actors
Pakistani male comedians
Nigar Award winners
Pakistani Shia Muslims
20th-century Pakistani male actors
Male actors from Karachi
1937 births
20th-century comedians